Beautiful Kitchens is a monthly interior design magazine about kitchens published by IPC Media.  It is edited by Helen Stone.

Early history
The magazine was launched in 1999 as bi-monthly 25 Beautiful Kitchens, its original editor was John Smigielski. Ysanne Brooks became editor in September 2004 when Smigielski was promoted to the parent publication, 25 Beautiful Homes.

The name of the magazine was shortened to just Beautiful Kitchens in February 2008.

References

Bi-monthly magazines published in the United Kingdom
Design magazines
English-language magazines
Magazines established in 1999
Monthly magazines published in the United Kingdom
Visual arts magazines published in the United Kingdom
1999 establishments in the United Kingdom